Margasin (also Romanized as Margasīn; also known as Margīn) is a village in Qaqazan-e Sharqi Rural District, in the Central District of Takestan County, Qazvin Province, Iran. At the 2006 census, its population was 278, in 69 families.

References 

Populated places in Takestan County